Ridderhof is a surname. Notable people with the surname include:

Joy Ridderhof (1903–1984), American missionary
Mark Ridderhof (born 1989), Dutch basketball player
Stanley E. Ridderhof (1896–1962), American naval aviator